The Commissioner for Federal Judicial Affairs is a support agency within the Canadian Department of Justice. FJA acts an arms-length agency from the Department of Justice and provides support for the federal judiciary, including:

 Administration of Part I of the Judges Act including salaries, allowances, pensions and benefits for judges and their spouses
 Supporting and administering a judicial intranet (JUDICOM) to allow for secure communication and information sharing
 Language training for Judges
 Publication of all Federal Court decisions in both official languages

Judicial Appointments Secretariat
Through its Judicial Appointments Secretariat FJA provides support for appointments of judges in provincial superior courts, federal courts, military courts and Supreme Court of Canada.

FJA Administers of the vetting and evaluation process through a series of 17 advisory committees. Committee members are appointed for a two-year term by the Governor-in-Council, which may be renewed at the federal government's discretion.

Appointment of Military Judges
Military Judges are appointed pursuant to the National Defence Act by the Governor in Council on the advise of the Minister of National Defence.

Similar to the appointment of civilian judges, candidates are vetted and evaluated by a committee consisting of members of the Canadian Armed forces and the legal community.

Qualitification
Military Judges must have been both officer of the Canadian Armed Forces and a practicing barrister within any province for a period of 10 years in order to be qualified as a candidate.

JUDICOM
FJA administers and maintains the Judicial Communications Network (JUDICOM), a private secure intranet used by the federal judiciary to facilitate communication and collaboration.

Federal Court Reports
FJA is responsible for publishing decisions of the Federal Court and the Federal Court of Appeal. Selected decisions are published in both official languages. Decisions are searchable in an online archive.

See also
Judicial Appointments in Canada

References

Canadian judges
Government of Canada